Bombay Dyeing & Manufacturing Company Limited is the flagship company of the Wadia Group, engaged primarily in the business of Textiles. Bombay Dyeing is one of India's largest producers of textiles.

Its current chairman is Nusli Wadia.
In March 2011, Jehangir Wadia, the younger son of Nusli, was named the managing director of Wadia Group's flagship, Bombay Dyeing & Manufacturing Company, while the elder son, Ness Wadia resigned from the post of joint MD of the company. Ratan Tata, the ex-chairman of Tata Group was on the board of directors till 2013. He resigned and Cyrus Mistry took over.

Bombay Dyeing was often in the news, apart from other things, for various controversies surrounding its tussle with the late Dhirubhai Ambani of Reliance Industries Limited and with Calcutta-based jute baron late Arun Bajoria.

See also
XSTOK
Grasim Industries

References

Indian companies established in 1879
Manufacturing companies based in Mumbai
Manufacturing companies established in 1879
Textile companies based in Maharashtra
Clothing brands of India
Wadia Group
Companies listed on the National Stock Exchange of India
Companies listed on the Bombay Stock Exchange